The Concord coach is a type of horse-drawn coach, often used as stagecoaches, mailcoaches, and hotel coaches. The term was first used for the coaches built by coach-builder J. Stephen Abbot and wheelwright Lewis Downing of the Abbot-Downing Company in Concord, New Hampshire, but later to be sometimes used generically. Like their predecessors, the Concords employed a style of suspension and construction particularly suited to North America's early 19th century roads. Leather thoroughbraces suspend passengers who are in constant motion while the coach is moving. The swaying is accepted by passengers for the shock absorbing action of the leather straps and for the way the special motion eases the coach over very rough patches of roadway. This suspension, which was developed by Philip de Chiese in the 17th century, was long replaced by steel springs in England.

The coaches developed out of earlier models, such as the “melon-shaped” coach illustrated by Captain Basil Hall, and was probably first built in this final form in Upstate New York, and were often known as “Troy coaches” or “Albany coaches”.

The Abbot-Downing Company, however, continued making these coaches for over 70 years, well after most their competitors, and the name became used as a generic term.

They were high-end, expensive vehicles; the cost was justified by long service life. The thoroughbrace suspension reduced stresses on the structure and improved passenger comfort.

Railroads began replacing stagecoaches in the middle of the 19th century, but Concord coaches remained in commercial use into the 20th century and continue to be used in parades and for publicity purposes by Wells Fargo Bank.

Dimensions
Concord coaches varied widely in capacity, from small four-person vehicles through the iconic 9 passenger heavy western mail coaches and beyond, so dimensions vary. (Rated sizes were for interior seats; a coach might carry more passengers outside.)

Design features

Construction

Timber: white oak, ash and basswood braced with iron bands. Iron fittings. Leather and canvas.

Undercarriage
The undercarriage supports the leather thoroughbraces carrying the body. The two axles are tied together by a firm undercarriage braced by three straight perches (lengthwise frame members) and given a relatively slim transom (the transverse members at either end of the perches).

Each end of each transom holds an upright metal standard from which hang the leather thoroughbraces.

Brakes
The back wheels have brake blocks acting on the iron tires. The driver controls them with a foot lever to his right at the side of his footboard.

Body
The body needs to make no contribution to the rigidity of the undercarriage and so is more lightly constructed than was the custom for European vehicles. This lightness also eases progress on the very rough roads.

There are three bench seats accommodating up to nine people though models to seat six and twelve passengers were available. The benches at the front and back of the body have limited headroom. Passengers on the center bench are given no backrest but steady themselves with a broad leather harness suspended across the coach by straps from the roof.

Another six passengers can travel in the open air on the body's roof. There is an external luggage compartment or boot at the back of the body and another boot for valuables below the driver's seat at the front.

Photo gallery

Horses
The leading horses are known as the lead horses. The wheel horses or wheelers are the back pair nearest the coach's wheels. The number of horses, usually four or six, could be even more. Two horses alone would very soon tire.

Operation

It is not possible to guide a Concord coach with European-style precision. The Concord body continuously shifts. The driver or coachman has to sit slightly askew and brace himself with the aid of a steeply angled footboard. He cannot keep his reins in a steady contact with the horses' mouths. He has to bend his arms and elbows to constantly compensate, and his body always leans slightly forward. He holds his left reins in his left hand and his right reins — separated by his middle finger — in his right hand and not all in one hand like a European could. It is easy to slacken an individual rein but much more difficult to shorten it. His right hand also has to control his whip used on the wheel horses. If obliged to make his right hand free, then he must lay all the right hand reins in his left hand unseparated.

The horses were harnessed very loosely by European standards because without proper roads the horses had to be allowed to avoid their particular obstacles. The Concord pole, though mounted to allow far more play, moved less.

The result was the coach's direction was straighter than with a European coach, it did not respond to every irregularity in the road.

Abbot-Downing wagon

Concord coaches were expensive. Abbot-Downing also supplied a much simpler, lighter, and less expensive vehicle which they named Overland wagon and later Western passenger wagon.

Notes

See also
 New Hampshire Historical Marker No. 128: The Concord Coach

References

External links
 Abbot-Downing Historical Society
 Concord Coach #472. This is the 9 feet high 12 interior passenger version scroll down
 Smithsonian video about US coaching

Coaches (carriage)
Animal-powered vehicles
History of road transport
Horse transportation